Běstvina is a municipality and village in Chrudim District in the Pardubice Region of the Czech Republic. It has about 600 inhabitants.

Administrative parts
Villages of Pařížov, Rostejn, Spačice and Vestec are administrative parts of Běstvina.

References

External links

Villages in Chrudim District